Ray marching is a class of rendering methods for 3D computer graphics where rays are traversed iteratively, effectively dividing each ray into smaller ray segments, sampling some function at each step. This function can encode volumetric data for volume ray casting, distance fields for accelerated intersection finding of surfaces, among other information.

Distance-aided ray marching

Sphere tracing 

In sphere tracing, or sphere-assisted ray marching an intersection point is approximated between the ray and a surface defined by a signed distance function (SDF). The SDF is evaluated for each iteration in order to be able take as large steps as possible without missing any part of the surface. A threshold is used to cancel further iteration when a point has reached that is close enough to the surface. As powerful GPU hardware became more widely available, this method was popularized by the demoscene and Inigo Quilez.

Signed distance functions exist for many primitive 3D shapes. They can be combined using mathematical operations like modulo and booleans to form more complex surfaces. For instance, taking the modulus of an SDF's input coordinates tiles its volume across all of space, and taking the maximum of two SDFs gives their volumes' surface of intersection. Because SDFs can be defined for many fractals, sphere tracing is often used for 3D fractal rendering.

Cube-assisted 

A similar technique to sphere-assisted ray marching, the use of cubes and taxicab distance can be used to render voxel volumes.

Volumetric ray marching

In volumetric ray marching, each ray is traced so that color and/or density can be sampled along the ray and then be combined into a final pixel color. This is often used for example when rendering clouds or 3D medical scans.

Deferred shading 

When rendering screen space effects, such as screen space reflection (SSR) and screen space shadows, rays are traced using G-buffers, where depth and surface normal data is stored per each 2D pixel.

External links 
The 1989 paper Hypertexture by Ken Perlin contains an early example of a ray marching method.

References 

3D imaging
Computer graphics algorithms